The British League of Rights was an offshoot of the Australian League of Rights founded in 1971. It was an "anti-semitic and white supremacist"  political group. The British League opposed the entry of the UK into the European Economic Community.

In the early 1970s it came under the direction of Don Martin, a former member of the Australian Young Liberals, who has run it ever since. Under Martin's direction the British League increased its membership. Conservative Monday Club member Lady Jane Birdwood was General Secretary. By 1974, the British League of Rights became the British chapter of the World Anti-Communist League, replacing Geoffrey Stewart-Smith's Foreign Affairs Circle, which claimed to have left due to the Anti-Communist League's anti-semitism. In 1975 the British League established an association with the Britons Publishing Company. Although not officially connected, the League of Rights had links to the National Front and during the leadership of John Tyndall articles that appeared in League of Rights publications were regularly reprinted in Tyndall's organ Spearhead.

The British League of Rights hosted the fourth Crown Commonwealth League of Rights conference in 1985.

Don Martin elected to resign from the chairmanship of the Policy Unit of the Federation of Small Businesses in 2001 as a result of a campaign by Gerry Gable's Searchlight magazine.

References

See also
Australian League of Rights
Canadian League of Rights
New Zealand League of Rights

Political organisations based in the United Kingdom
Far-right politics in the United Kingdom
1971 establishments in the United Kingdom
Organizations established in 1971
Anti-communist organizations
Anti-communism in the United Kingdom